Les Bottereaux is a commune in the Eure department in Normandy in northern France. The Anglo-Norman family of the Barons Botreaux probably originated here.

Population

See also
Communes of the Eure department

References

Communes of Eure